The 1994 Enfield Council election took place on 5 May 1994 to elect members of Enfield London Borough Council in London, England. The whole council was up for election and the Labour party gained overall control of the council. This was the first Labour win in Enfield since 1964, ending 26 years of Conservative administration.

Background

Election result

Ward results

References

1994
1994 London Borough council elections